FC Nafkom Brovary was a Ukrainian professional team from Brovary in Kyiv Oblast.

NAFKOM is a portmanteau which stands for Our Football Team.

History
The professional club was formed in 2001 in Irpin, Kyiv Oblast in the name of Nafkom-Akademia under the auspices of the Financial and Commercial Educational Institution (UFEI) that is in Irpin. In 2002 there was another club from Brovary that competed in the Ukrainian Amateur Cup.

In 2008–2009, Oleh Fedorchuk was a manager of the club.

Nafkom withdrew after the 2008–09 season completed failing to receive a professional license. Many players along with a football manager Oleh Fedorchuk joined FC Nyva Vinnytsia.

Team names
{|class="wikitable"
|-bgcolor="#efefef"
|Year
|Name
|-
|1996–1999
|UFEI Irpin (as amateurs)
|-
|2000
|Akademia Irpin (as amateurs)
|-
|2001–2004
|Nafkom-Akademia Irpin (entering the Professional Football League)
|-
|2004–2009
|Nafkom Brovary (moved to Brovary prior to start of season)
|}

Honors

Ukrainian Druha Liha: 1
 2002/03 Champions Group B

Runners Up: 1
 2001/02 Group B

League and cup history
{|class="wikitable"
|-bgcolor="#efefef"
! Season
! Div.
! Pos.
! Pl.
! W
! D
! L
! GS
! GA
! P
!Domestic Cup
!colspan=2|Europe
!Notes
|-
|align=center|1997–98
|align=center|4th "2"
|align=center|4
|align=center|14
|align=center|7
|align=center|1
|align=center|6
|align=center|12
|align=center|11
|align=center|22
|align=center|
|align=center|
|align=center|
|align=center|as UFEI Irpin
|-
|align=center|1998–99
|align=center|4th "2"
|align=center|5
|align=center|14
|align=center|6
|align=center|4
|align=center|4
|align=center|12
|align=center|12
|align=center|22
|align=center|
|align=center|
|align=center|
|align=center|as UFEI Irpin
|-
|align=center|1999
|align=center|4th "2"
|align=center|6
|align=center|10
|align=center|1
|align=center|2
|align=center|7
|align=center|5
|align=center|14
|align=center|5
|align=center|
|align=center|
|align=center|
|align=center|as UFEI Irpin
|-
|align=center rowspan=2|2000
|align=center|4th "3"
|align=center bgcolor=silver|2
|align=center|8
|align=center|3
|align=center|3
|align=center|2
|align=center|9
|align=center|6
|align=center|12
|align=center|
|align=center|
|align=center|
|align=center rowspan=2|as Akademia Irpin
|-
|align=center|4th "10"
|align=center|4
|align=center|6
|align=center|0
|align=center|1
|align=center|5
|align=center|3
|align=center|19
|align=center|1
|align=center|
|align=center|
|align=center|
|-
|align=center|2001–02
|align=center|3rd "B"
|align=center bgcolor=silver|2
|align=center|34
|align=center|19
|align=center|6
|align=center|9
|align=center|50
|align=center|23
|align=center|63
|align=center|Did not enter
|align=center|
|align=center|
|align=center|as Nafkom-Akademia Irpin
|-
|align=center|2002–03
|align=center|3rd "B"
|align=center bgcolor=gold|1
|align=center|30
|align=center|20
|align=center|7
|align=center|3
|align=center|69
|align=center|20
|align=center|67
|align=center|1/8 finals
|align=center|
|align=center|
|align=center bgcolor=Green|Promotedas Nafkom-Akademia Irpin
|-
|align=center|2003–04
|align=center|2nd
|align=center|14
|align=center|34
|align=center|9
|align=center|11
|align=center|14
|align=center|35
|align=center|43
|align=center|38
|align=center|1/16 finals
|align=center|
|align=center|
|align=center|as Nafkom-Akademia Irpin
|-
|align=center|2004–05
|align=center|2nd
|align=center|16
|align=center|34
|align=center|9
|align=center|10
|align=center|15
|align=center|26
|align=center|38
|align=center|37
|align=center|1/16 finals
|align=center|
|align=center|
|align=center bgcolor=red|Relegated
|-
|align=center|2005–06
|align=center|3rd "C"
|align=center|4
|align=center|24
|align=center|12
|align=center|6
|align=center|6
|align=center|28
|align=center|18
|align=center|42
|align=center|1/32 finals
|align=center|
|align=center|
|align=center|
|-
|align=center|2006–07
|align=center|3rd "A"
|align=center|6
|align=center|28
|align=center|13
|align=center|7
|align=center|8
|align=center|40
|align=center|30
|align=center|46
|align=center|1/32 finals
|align=center|
|align=center|
|align=center|
|-
|align=center|2007–08
|align=center|3rd "A"
|align=center|13
|align=center|30
|align=center|7
|align=center|8
|align=center|15
|align=center|33
|align=center|46
|align=center|29
|align=center|1/32 finals
|align=center|
|align=center|
|align=center|
|-
|align=center|2008–09
|align=center|3rd "A"
|align=center|5
|align=center|32
|align=center|16
|align=center|4
|align=center|12
|align=center|45
|align=center|33
|align=center|52
|align=center|1/64 finals
|align=center|
|align=center|
|align=center|Withdrew
|}

Managers
 2001–2004 Oleh Fedorchuk
 2004 Vitaliy Belokon
 2005–2007 Aleksandr Deriberin
 2007–2009 Oleh Fedorchuk

Notes and references

See also
FC Brovary

External links
 Unofficial Site

 
Nafkom Brovary
Association football clubs established in 1996
Association football clubs disestablished in 2009
Sport in Brovary
Sport in Irpin
Football clubs in Kyiv Oblast
1996 establishments in Ukraine
2009 disestablishments in Ukraine
Sports team relocations